Shiavax Jal Vazifdar (May 4, 1956), born to a Parsi family, is a former Chief Justice of the Punjab and Haryana High Court.

Career
He studied at Rishi Valley School, graduating from there in 1972 and obtained his Bachelor of Laws from Hinduja 
Law College. He enrolled as an advocate of Bar Council of Maharashtra and Goa in 1980. He practiced Civil, Constitutional, Company and Arbitration cases in the Bombay High Court.

In January 2001, he was sworn in as a Judge of the Bombay High Court. In 2016, he was sworn in as Chief Justice of the Punjab and Haryana High Court. He retired in May 2018.

References 

1956 births
Living people
Parsi people
Chief Justices of the Punjab and Haryana High Court
21st-century Indian lawyers
21st-century Indian judges